Sir Cecil Hermann Kisch, KCIE, CB (31 March 1884 – 20 October 1961) was a British civil servant in the India Office who rose to be Deputy Under-Secretary of State for India from 1943 to 1946. In later life, he became an author and historian, and had a long literary career.

Early life and family 
He belonged to the Jewish Kisch family of Prague. He was born on 31 March 1884 in Kolkata, India. He was the son of Herman Michael Kisch and Alice Charlotte Kisch.

His father Michael Kisch joined the Imperial Civil Service in 1873 and later became the deputy secretary to government of India, postmaster-general of Bengal as well as director-general of the post office in India.

His brother Frederick Hermann Kisch became a British delegate to the Versailles peace conference after having fought in First World War.

Cecil Kisch has been married twice, once to Myra Hannah Kisch and the other time to Rebecca Grace Kisch.

He died on 20 October, 1961 in London, England.

Career 
He joined the General Post Office in 1907, then was appointed to the India Office in 1908. In 1917, he became a private secretary to Edwin Montagu, the then Secretary of State for India.

In 1921, he was appointed as the finance department of the India Office and was the key driver behind numerous monetary reforms including the establishment of the Reserve Bank of India.

He has represented India at the international monetary conference at Geneva in 1933 and later served on the supervisory finance committee of the League of Nations.

Works
He has also authored a number of works on colonial India and its monetary policies:

 Central banks; a study of the constitutions of banks of issue, with an analysis of representative charters 

 The principles and problems of federal finance

 The Portuguese bank note case; the story and solution of a financial perplexity 

He has translated a number of works from Russian language to the English language: 

 The waggon of life, and other lyrics by Russian poets of the nineteenth century

 Alexander Blok, prophet of revolution; a study of his life and work illustrated by translations from his poems and other writings

Awards and honours
At the 1919 New Year Honours, he was made a Companion of the Order of the Bath.

He received his knighthood at the 1932 Birthday Honours and was awarded the Order of the Indian Empire.

References

1884 births
1961 deaths
English historians
Historians of India
English male non-fiction writers
Knights Commander of the Order of the Indian Empire
Companions of the Order of the Bath
People educated at Clifton College
Alumni of Trinity College, Oxford
Civil servants in the General Post Office
Civil servants in the India Office
20th-century British civil servants
British people in colonial India